Taina Maria Ojaniemi, formerly Kolkkala, née Uppa (born 24 October 1976 in Pori) is a retired female javelin thrower from Finland. Her personal best is 64.06 metres, achieved in July 2000 in Pihtipudas. She is nicknamed "Taikku".

International competitions

References

sports-reference

1976 births
Living people
Sportspeople from Pori
Finnish female javelin throwers
Athletes (track and field) at the 1996 Summer Olympics
Athletes (track and field) at the 2000 Summer Olympics
Athletes (track and field) at the 2004 Summer Olympics
Olympic athletes of Finland
World Athletics Championships athletes for Finland